The Wenaha River is a tributary of the Grande Ronde River, about  long, in the U.S. state of Oregon. The river begins at the confluence of its north and south forks in the Blue Mountains and flows east through the Wenaha–Tucannon Wilderness to meet the larger river at the small settlement of Troy. A designated Wild and Scenic River for its entire length, the stream flows wholly within Wallowa County.

Course

In the wilderness, tributaries enter the river in the following order headed downstream: Beaver Creek, Slick Ear Creek, and Rock Creek, all from the left; Big Hole Canyon from the right; Butte Creek, left; Swamp Creek, right; Weller Creek, left; Cross Canyon, right; Fairview Creek, left; Burnt Canyon, right; Crooked Creek, left. Below Crooked Creek, the river leaves the wilderness, turns southeast and exits the national forest.

Recreation
Weather permitting, the trail is open for hiking and backpacking.

Fishing along the secluded river is good. Modest numbers of steelhead (seagoing rainbow trout) swim upriver from the Grande Ronde, though fishing for them is limited. Bull trout, which also frequent the river, are protected, subject to catch-and-release regulations.

See also
 List of rivers of Oregon

References

External links
 Wenaha River Packrafting  Video produced by Oregon Field Guide

Rivers of Oregon
Tributaries of the Snake River
Rivers of Wallowa County, Oregon
Wild and Scenic Rivers of the United States
Oregon placenames of Native American origin